Chanchal College is a college in Chanchal in the Malda district of West Bengal, India. The college is affiliated to the University of Gour Banga, offering undergraduate courses.

Departments

Science 
 Chemistry
 Physics
 Mathematics
 History
 Political Science
 Economics
 Philosophy
 Commerce

See also

References

External links

University of Gour Banga
University Grants Commission
National Assessment and Accreditation Council

Universities and colleges in Malda district
Education in Malda district
Educational institutions established in 1969
1969 establishments in West Bengal